Thomas Goode is a china, silverware and glass shop at 19 South Audley Street in Mayfair, London. It holds two royal warrants to supply the British royal household, one from Queen Elizabeth II and the other from the Prince of Wales. The company has been owned by property entrepreneur Johnny Sandelson since 2018 and has since expanded its operations into India opening a store and museum in Mumbai.

History 
The shop was established in 1827 by Thomas Goode, and expanded by his son William. The younger Goode travelled extensively to find appropriate porcelain and china for the shop, which resulted in several notable customers including Queen Victoria and the Tsar of Russia. The store moved to its current site in 1845. In 1875 its showroom was redesigned by the architect Ernest George.

The company was owned by the Liberal Democrat peer Rumi Verjee from 1995 to 2018.

The building was sold to property entrepreneur Johnny Sandelson for £80 million in 2015, but Verjee retained ownership of the business. Sandelson acquired the business in 2018.

The Thomas Goode Elephants 
As part of The Paris Exhibition in 1889, Minton pottery was commissioned to create two, seven feet tall majolica elephants to display. These elephants are now on display in the windows of Thomas Goode.

References

External links
Thomas Goode website

Shops in London
Mayfair